FLW for FLW may refer to:
 Famous Last Words (disambiguation)
 Fishing League Worldwide
 Flood warning
 Flores Airport, in the Azores, Portugal
 FLW remote weapon station
 Fort Leonard Wood (military base), in Missouri, United States
 Four-letter word
 Frank Lloyd Wright (1867–1959), American architect
 Fulwell railway station, in London